Yudai Nagano may refer to: